Taiwan is ruled by various regimes throughout its history. Since 1945, the island is ruled by the Republic of China (ROC).

The ROC was the government of mainland China from 1912 to 1949, when this government fled to Taiwan during the Chinese Civil War, and the country today is commonly called Taiwan. The ROC controlled majority parts of China until 1949, but today only controls Taiwan, Penghu, Kinmen, Matsu and nearby smaller islands. However, the Republic of China claims all of China as its territory, so some of its official symbols represent China.

Symbols of the Republic of China

See also 
National symbols of China

References